Henry King Alford (1852–1930) was the mayor of Toowoomba, Queensland from 1911–1912.  He was born on 22 July 1852 to Thomas Alford, a pioneer in the Toowoomba district, and is reputed to be the first white child born in Toowoomba.  He worked at the Australian Joint Stock Bank as a young man before becoming involved in real estate.  He died on 19 August 1930.

References

1852 births
1930 deaths
Mayors of Toowoomba